The European microstates or European ministates are a set of very small sovereign states in Europe. In modern contexts the term is typically used to refer to the six smallest states in Europe by area: Andorra, Liechtenstein, Malta, Monaco, San Marino, and Vatican City (the Holy See). Four of these states are monarchies (three principalities—Andorra, Liechtenstein, and Monaco—and one papacy, Vatican City). These states trace their status back to the first millennium or the early second millennium except for Liechtenstein, created in the 17th century.

Microstates are small independent states recognised by larger states. According to the qualitative definition suggested by Zbigniew Dumieński (2014), microstates can also be viewed as "modern protected states, i.e. sovereign states that have been able to unilaterally depute certain attributes of sovereignty to larger powers in exchange for benign protection of their political and economic viability against their geographic or demographic constraints." In line with this definition, only Andorra, Liechtenstein, Monaco, and San Marino qualify as "microstates" as only these states are sovereignties functioning in close, but voluntary, association with their respective larger neighbours. Luxembourg, which is much larger than all the European microstates combined, nonetheless shares some of these characteristics.

Some scholars dispute the status of the Vatican City as a state, arguing that "[i]n two respects it may be doubted whether the territorial entity, the Vatican City, meets the traditional criteria of statehood" and that "[t]he special status of the Vatican City is probably best regarded as a means of ensuring that the Pope can freely exercise his spiritual functions, and in this respect is loosely analogous to that of the headquarters of international organisations."

List of states often labelled as microstates

Economic policies and relationship with the European Union

The European microstates are all of limited size and/or population. They also have limited natural resources. As a result, they have adopted special economic policies, typically involving low levels of taxation and few restrictions on external financial investment. Malta is a full member of the European Union, while the other five European microstates have obtained special relations with the European Union. Many of the microstates have also entered into a customs union with their larger neighbours to improve their economic situation (Vatican City and San Marino with Italy, Liechtenstein with Switzerland, Monaco with France). Most of them lack clearly marked borders; for example, Monaco forms a continuous metropolitan area with its neighbouring French communes (the largest being Beausoleil) and has many streets running across or along the border.

Similar entities

Dependencies
While the microstates have sovereignty over their own territory, there are also a number of small autonomous territories, which despite having (in almost all cases) their own independent government, executive branch, legislature, judiciary, police, and other trappings of independence, are nonetheless under the sovereignty of another state or monarch.

 Akrotiri and Dhekelia (British Overseas Territory)
 Åland (autonomous county of Finland)
 Bailiwick of Guernsey (British Crown Dependency), a part of the Channel Islands, consisting of three separate sub-jurisdictions: Alderney, Guernsey, and Sark
 Bailiwick of Jersey (British Crown Dependency), a part of the Channel Islands
 Faroe Islands (self-governing territory of the Kingdom of Denmark)
 Gibraltar (British Overseas Territory)
 Isle of Man (British Crown Dependency)
 Mount Athos (autonomous monastic community in Greece)

Sovereign Military Order of Malta

The Sovereign Military Order of Malta is a Catholic lay order that is a traditional example of a sovereign entity under international law other than a state.

Unlike the Holy See, which is sovereign over the Vatican City, the Order has no territory. However, its headquarters, located in Palazzo Malta and Villa Malta, are granted extraterritoriality by Italy, and the same status is recognised by Malta regarding its historical headquarters, located in Fort St Angelo. The Order is the direct successor to the medieval Knights Hospitaller, also known as the Knights of Malta, and today operates as a largely charitable and ceremonial organisation.

It has permanent non-state observer status at the United Nations, has full diplomatic relations, including embassies, with 100 states and is in more informal relationships with five others. It issues its own stamps, coins, passports, and license plates, and has its own army medical corps.

Historical small territories
The wars of the French Revolution and the Napoleonic Wars caused the European map to be redrawn several times. A number of short-lived client republics were created, and the fall of the Holy Roman Empire gave sovereignty to each of its many surviving Kleinstaaten. The situation was not stabilised until after the Congress of Vienna in 1815. Following World War I and World War II a number of territories gained temporary status as international zones, protectorates or occupied territories. A few of them are mentioned here:

Popular culture and sports
 Association football club AS Monaco FC, though based in Monaco, plays in the French football league system. In contrast, Malta maintains its own league system with a 14-team top division.
 Some of the European microstates are members of the Games of the Small States of Europe (GSSE); several of the island dependencies compete in the Island Games, alongside several other island dependencies from elsewhere in the world. Countries that participate at the Games of the Small States of Europe are: Andorra, Cyprus, Iceland, Liechtenstein, Luxembourg, Malta, Monaco, Montenegro and San Marino.
 Monaco (since 1959), Malta (since 1971), Andorra (from 2004 to 2009),  and San Marino (debut in 2008, then from 2011 onwards) are or were contestant countries of Eurovision Song Contest.

See also

Enclave and exclave
Games of the Small States of Europe
List of fictional European countries

References

External links
Article from The Economist, 24 December 2005, "Castles in the Air"
GlobaLex, "The Micro-States and Small Jurisdictions of Europe"

Microstates
 Microstates
Eurasia